Carmen McRae is a 1955 album by Jazz singer Carmen McRae. It was McRae's second album and was released on the Bethlehem label exclusively as 10" monoaural LP.> The album was reissued on LP in 1976 as The Finest of Carmen McRae: You'd Be So Easy to Love, with an additional track, "Too Much in Love to Care". In 1994 Betlehem had digitally remastered the recordings and released a CD with six additional tracks, alternate takes of songs from the original sessions.

Reception

Scott Yanow reviewed the album for Allmusic and wrote that of it that "Overall the music is pleasing but not too memorable and one wishes there were more variety".

Track listing 
 "You'd Be So Easy to Love" (Cole Porter) - 2:26 	
 "If I'm Lucky (I'll Be the One)" (Chuck Darwin, Paulette Girard) - 3:17
 "Old Devil Moon" (E.Y. "Yip" Harburg, Burton Lane) - 2:40
 "Tip Toe Gently" (Mat Mathews, Girard) - 2:40 
 "You Made Me Care" (Darwin, Girard) - 2:09 
 "Last Time for Love" (Carmen McRae) - 3:05
 "Misery" (Tony Scott) - 3:53
 "Too Much in Love to Care" (Carroll Coates, James J. Kriegsmann) - 2:33
Alternate takes released on 1994 CD reissue
"Too Much in Love to Care" (Alternate take) - 3:19
 "Old Devil Moon" (Alternate stereo) - 2:37
 "You Made Me Care" (Alternate stereo) - 2:09
 "Too Much in Love to Care" (Alternate stereo) - 2:20
 "Last Time for Love" (Alternate stereo) - 3:03

Personnel 
Carmen McRae - vocals
Tracks 1-4
Herbie Mann - flute, tenor saxophone
Mat Mathews - accordion
Mundell Lowe - guitar
Wendell Marshall - double bass
Kenny Clarke - drums
Tracks 5-8
Tony Scott - clarinet, piano (on "Misery")
Dick Katz - piano
Skip Fawcett - double bass
Osie Johnson - drums

References 

1955 debut albums
Carmen McRae albums
Bethlehem Records albums